The SS St. Lawrence Victory (MCV-735) was a type VC2-S-AP2 Victory-class cargo ship built for the United States during World War II. The ship was built as part of the Emergency Shipbuilding program by Permanente Metals Corporation in Yard 2 of the Richmond Shipyards in Richmond, California. 

Launched in March 1945, the St Lawrence Victory delivered supplies for the Pacific War. After the war, it served as a relief ship delivering supplies to Europe under the Marshall Plan.  Damaged by a sea mine in 1947, it was salvaged by Yugoslavia then changed hands several times in private use before it was scrapped in 1973.

Early history
The SS St. Lawrence Victorys keel was laid on January 25, 1945, before being christened on March 31, 1945. The St. Lawrence Victory was a US Maritime Administration armed cargo ship, named for St. Lawrence University in St. Lawrence County, New York as one of 150 educational institutions which had Victory ships named after them.  Constructed for the US Maritime Commission (MARCOM), this 10,600-ton ship was built at the Oregon Shipbuilding yards in just 65 days. The ship was operated by the Agwilines Inc under the United States Merchant Marine act for the War Shipping Administration.

Victory ships were designed to replace the earlier Liberty ships. Liberty ships were intended to be used solely for World War II. In contrast, Victory ships were built to last longer and serve the US Navy after the war. The Victory ship differed from a Liberty ship in that they were faster, longer, wider, taller, and had a thinner stack set farther toward the superstructure and a long raised forecastle.

Missions
The first mission of the St. Lawrence Victory was to deliver bombs to Saipan for the Pacific War. Loaded with her maximum weight of 10,000 tons of explosive material, the ship traversed the Pacific Ocean to Saipan, traveling in a zig-zag motion to elude Japanese submarines; the ship journeyed under radio silence and without running lights at night. After delivering her cargo, she proceeded to Seattle, arriving in July 1945. On August 27 of that year, the St. Lawrence Victory joined Task Group 30.8, a Sea Logistics Group delivering supplies to troops stationed on Guam.

After the war, the SS St. Lawrence Victory served as a relief ship as part of the Marshall Plan, carrying supplies to war-torn European nations. The cargo ship continued to serve in this capacity until March 25, 1947, when it hit a sea mine off the coast of Dubrovnik, Yugoslavia. With a damaged bow and in danger of sinking, she was deliberately run aground on Korčula Island before being towed to port at Split, Croatia. Afterwards, she was claimed by Yugoslavia as a marine salvage ship, eventually repaired and put into private use as a passenger ship.

Japan surrender ceremony
The SS St. Lawrence Victory was one of only two civilian cargo ships in Tokyo Bay during the Surrender Ceremony of Japan on September 2, 1945, the other being the SS Winthrop Victory.

Private use
In 1948, the St. Lawrence Victory was initially renamed  Zagreb and in the following year Hrvatska for private operation as a passenger ship, operated by Jugoslavenska Slobodna Plovidba of Rijeka. In 1967 she was sold to Adab S.A. of Geneva. The Hrvatska was managed by Dabinovic S.A. of Geneva and operated under the flag of Burundi.
Later in 1967, the ship was sold to Cia. Nav. Adriatica Ltda. of San Jose, Costa Rica. In 1968 it was sold to Soc. D'Avances Commerciales S.A. as the SS Armelle registered to Somalia. She was sold once more in 1971 to Soc. de Gerance et de Transports Maritimes, Mogadiscio of Somalia before being scrapped in 1973, in Bilbao, Spain.

See also
List of Victory ships
 Liberty ship
 Type C1 ship
 Type C2.2.2 ship
 Type C2 ship
 Type C3 ship

References

Sources
Sawyer, L. A. and W. H. Mitchell. Victory ships and tankers: The history of the 'Victory' type cargo ships and of the tankers built in the United States of America during World War II, Cornell Maritime Press, 1974, 0-87033-182-5.
United States Maritime Commission: 
Victory Cargo Ships 

Victory ships
Ships built in Portland, Oregon
United States Merchant Marine
1945 ships
World War II merchant ships of the United States